Theodore Burr House (also known as Oxford Memorial Library) is a historic home located at Oxford in Chenango County, New York. It is a box like, wood-frame 2-story building with recessed -story wings. It was built between 1810 and 1812 by Theodore Burr (1771–1822), one of the founding settlers of Oxford. It was a private residence until 1843, then a rectory until 1900 when it became the public library building.

It was added to the National Register of Historic Places on September 11, 1981.

References

Houses on the National Register of Historic Places in New York (state)
Federal architecture in New York (state)
Houses completed in 1812
Houses in Chenango County, New York
National Register of Historic Places in Chenango County, New York